United Security Bancshares is a bank holding company headquartered in Fresno, California. It operates 11 branches.

History
United Security Bank was formed on December 21, 1987.

In March 2001, the bank became a subsidiary of United Security Bancshares, a bank holding company.

In June 2009, the bank entered into an agreement with the Federal Reserve Bank of San Francisco as a result of its level of non-performing assets.

In 2014, the bank settled a dispute with TRC Operating Company over fraudulent wire transfers for $350,000. The authentication credentials for TRCs account had been compromised which allowed hackers to transfer the money.

References

External links

Companies listed on the Nasdaq
1987 establishments in California
Banks established in 1987
Banks based in California